Pataveh-ye Rud Sameh (also Romanized as Pāţāveh-ye Rūd Sameh; also known as Pāţāveh) is a village in Bahmayi-ye Sarhadi-ye Gharbi Rural District, Dishmok District, Kohgiluyeh County, Kohgiluyeh and Boyer-Ahmad Province, Iran. At the 2006 census, its population was 92, in 16 families.

References 

Populated places in Kohgiluyeh County